Bura Sara (also Romanized as Būrā Sarā; also known as Booneh Sara, Būrah Sarā, Bura Sarāi, Būr Sarā, and Maḩalleh-ye Būrsarā) is a village in Khotbeh Sara Rural District, Kargan Rud District, Talesh County, Gilan Province, Iran. At the 2006 census, its population was 772, in 180 families.

References 

Populated places in Talesh County